Porodaedalea chrysoloma is a species of fungus belonging to the family Hymenochaetaceae.

It is native to Northern Europe.

Synonym:
 Phellinus abietis (P. Karst.) H.Jahn, 1967

References

Hymenochaetaceae